Dominique Jackson is an American politician serving as an administrator of the United States Department of Housing and Urban Development for the 8th region. From 2017 to 2021, she represented the 42nd district in the Colorado House of Representatives.

Early life and education 
Jackson earned a Bachelor of Arts degree in communications from the Metropolitan State University of Denver and a Master of Arts in international and intercultural communications from the University of Denver.

Career 
Prior to her election to the Colorado State House, she worked as a communications consultant and served on Aurora's Citizens Advisory Committee for Housing and Community Development.

In the Colorado State House, Jackson served on the House Health, Insurance, & Environment Committee and the House Transportation & Energy Committee.

Elections
Jackson was elected to the House of Representatives in 2016, winning with 68.91% of the vote against Republican opponent Mike Donald.

References

External links
Official campaign website

21st-century American politicians
Living people
Democratic Party members of the Colorado House of Representatives
Metropolitan State University of Denver alumni
Women state legislators in Colorado
People from Aurora, Colorado
Year of birth missing (living people)
21st-century American women politicians
United States Department of Housing and Urban Development officials
University of Denver alumni